Diastylis is a genus of crustaceans which belong to the family Diastylidae. It includes the following species:

Diastylis abboti Gladfelter, 1975
Diastylis abbreviata G. O. Sars, 1871
Diastylis acuminata Jones, 1960
Diastylis alaskensis Calman, 1912
Diastylis algoae Zimmer, 1908
Diastylis ambigua Le Loeuff & Intes, 1972
Diastylis anderssoni Zimmer, 1907
Diastylis antillensis Sars, 1873
Diastylis araruamae Petrescu & Bacescu, 1991
Diastylis argentata Calman, 1912
Diastylis aspera Calman, 1912
Diastylis bidentata Calman, 1912
Diastylis bispinosa (Stimpson, 1853)
Diastylis boecki Zimmer, 1930
Diastylis bradyi Norman, 1879
Diastylis brasilianus Bacescu & Petrescu, 1991
Diastylis calderoni Donath-Hernandez, 1988
Diastylis californica Zimmer, 1936
Diastylis corniculata Hale, 1937
Diastylis cornuifer Blake, 1929
Diastylis cornuta (Boeck, 1864)
Diastylis crenellata Watling & McCann, 1996
Diastylis dalli Calman, 1912
Diastylis delicata Jones, 1969
Diastylis denticulata Jones, 1956
Diastylis dollfusi Fage, 1928
Diastylis doryphora Fage, 1940
Diastylis echinata Bate, 1865
Diastylis edwardsii (Krøyer, 1841)
Diastylis enigmatica Ledoyer, 1993
Diastylis exilicauda Jones, 1969
Diastylis fimbriata Sars, 1873
Diastylis galeronae Ledoyer, 1993
Diastylis gayi (Nicolet, 1849)
Diastylis geocostae Bacescu & Petrescu, 1991
Diastylis gibbera Jones, 1969
Diastylis goodsiri (Bell, 1855)
Diastylis granulata Zimmer, 1921
Diastylis hammoniae Zimmer, 1902
Diastylis hexaceros Zimmer, 1908
Diastylis hirsuta Petrescu & Bacescu, 1991
Diastylis horrida Sars, 1886
Diastylis inermis Ledoyer, 1988
Diastylis inornata Hale, 1937
Diastylis inplicata Park & Hong, 1999
Diastylis insularum (Calman, 1908)
Diastylis jonesi Reyss, 1972
Diastylis justi Petrescu & Bacescu, 1991
Diastylis koreana Calman, 1911
Diastylis krameri Zimmer, 1921
Diastylis laevis Norman, 1869
Diastylis lazarevi Lomakina, 1955
Diastylis lepechini Zimmer, 1926
Diastylis loricata Lomakina, 1955
Diastylis lucifera (Krøyer, 1837)
Diastylis manca (Sars), 1873
Diastylis matsuei Gamo, 1968
Diastylis mawsoni Calman, 1918
Diastylis namibiae Day, 1980
Diastylis neapolitana Sars, 1879
Diastylis neozealanica Thomson, 1892
Diastylis nitens Gamo, 1968
Diastylis nucella Calman, 1912
Diastylis omorii Gamo, 1968
Diastylis ornata Lomakina, 1952
Diastylis oxyrhyncha Zimmer, 1926
Diastylis paralaskensis Vassilenko & Tzareva, 1990
Diastylis paraspinulosa Zimmer, 1926
Diastylis paratricinta Kang & Lee, 1996
Diastylis pellucida Hart, 1930
Diastylis planifrons Calman, 1912
Diastylis polaris Sars, 1871
Diastylis polita Smith, 1879
Diastylis pseudinornata Ledoyer, 1977
Diastylis quadriplicata Watling & McCann, 1996
Diastylis quadrispinosa G. O. Sars, 1871
Diastylis racovitzai Bacescu & Petrescu, 1991
Diastylis rathkei (Krøyer, 1841)
Diastylis richardi Fage, 1929
Diastylis rostrata Goodsir, 1885
Diastylis rugosa Sars, 1865
Diastylis samurai Zimmer, 1943
Diastylis santamariensis Watling & McCann, 1996
Diastylis scorpioides (Lepechin, 1780)
Diastylis sculpta G. O. Sars, 1871
Diastylis sentosa Watling & McCann, 1996
Diastylis serratocostata Watling & McCann, 1996
Diastylis spinulosa Heller, 1875
Diastylis stygia Sars, 1871
Diastylis sulcata Calman, 1912
Diastylis sympterygiae Bacescu & Lima de Quieroz, 1985
Diastylis tenebricosa Jones, 1969
Diastylis tenuicauda Lomakina, 1967
Diastylis tetradon Lomakina, 1955
Diastylis tongoyensis Gergen & Watling, 1998
Diastylis tricincta (Zimmer, 1903)
Diastylis tumida (Liljeborg, 1855)
Diastylis umatillensis Lie, 1971
Diastylis utinomii Gamo, 1968
Diastylis vemae Bacescu, 1961
Diastylis zimmeri Ledoyer, 1977

References

Cumacea